The Swedish National Time Trial Championships have been held since 1909.

Men

Women

See also
Swedish National Road Race Championships
National Road Cycling Championships

References

National road cycling championships
Cycle races in Sweden
Recurring sporting events established in 1909
1909 establishments in Sweden